Manjot Singh (born 7 July 1992) is an Indian Bollywood actor, best known for his role in films like Oye Lucky! Lucky Oye!, Student Of The Year and Fukrey. He won Filmfare Critics Award for the Best Debut Actor category for his performance in Oye Lucky! Lucky Oye!. He completed his schooling from Hillwoods Academy.

Early life and education 
Manjot Singh was born in New Delhi into a Punjabi Sikh family. His mother is a housewife while his father is a businessman. He completed his schooling from the Hillwoods Academy, situated in New Delhi.

Career
He went to audition for Dibakar Banerjee's Oye Lucky! Lucky Oye!, though Singh had never acted before, even in school plays. After the audition, the casting director rejected Singh for the role of the boy who grows up to be master thief Lucky. However, Dibakar Banerjee insisted on casting him, later saying "Even though the casting director wasn't convinced, I just put my foot down."

Critics on Manjot in his debut
 Planet Bollywood: "Young Lucky (played marvellously by Manjot Singh)..."
 Rediff.com: "...young Lucky (brilliantly played by Manjot Singh)..."
 Reviewer Noyon Jyoti Parasara: "...Special mention is deserved by Manjot Singh, who plays the younger Lucky."
 Khalid Mohammad: "And there's Lucky, as a callow teenager (excellently played by Manjot Singh)..."

After being selected, Singh went to Manali for a week-long acting workshop. He was asked to observe the way Abhay Deol walked, smiled and talked so that he could imitate that in his acting. He even wore a cheek pad so that his jaw would look as broad as Abhay Deol's. Singh's performance was well appreciated by the critics and he received the Filmfare Critics Award for the Best Actor category. Later, Manjot participated in the reality show Fear Factor - Khatron Ke Khiladi Level 3 in 2010.

In 2012, Singh starred in Udaan, directed by Vikramaditya Motwane. The film received positive reviews, and is considered a postmodern masterpiece. Later in 2012, Singh signed up for Punjabi musical drama Pure Punjabi, directed by Munish Sharma, about four close friends in Punjab who had a strong passion for music. In the same year, he played the character role of Dimpy in Karan Johar's coming-of-age romantic comedy film, Student of the Year, starring Siddharth Malhotra, Alia Bhatt and Varun Dhawan in the lead roles.

In 2013,  Singh starred in Fukrey, directed by Mrighdeep Singh Lamba, starring Vishakha Singh, Richa Chadda, Priya Anand, Ali Fazal, Varun Sharma and Pulkit Samrat.

In 2019, Singh Starred in Penalty directed by Shubham Singh, Starring Kay Kay Menon, Shashank Arora, Mohit Nain.

Filmography

Films

Television

References

External links
 

Living people
Male actors from Delhi
Indian male film actors
Male actors in Hindi cinema
Punjabi people
Indian Sikhs
1992 births
Filmfare Awards winners
Fear Factor: Khatron Ke Khiladi participants